The 1999 British Speedway Championship was the 39th edition of the British Speedway Championship. The Final took place on 23 May at Brandon in Coventry, England. The Championship was won by Mark Loram, with Joe Screen in second place and Chris Louis winning a run-off with Scott Nicholls for third.

Final 
23 May 1999
 Brandon Stadium, Coventry

{| width=100%
|width=50% valign=top|

See also 
 British Speedway Championship

References 

British Speedway Championship
Great Britain